Vilma Luik (born 7 November 1959, in Tartu) is an Estonian actress.

From 1977 to 1978 Luik studied at the Vanemuine studios. In 1982 she graduated from Tallinn State Conservatory's performing arts department. Since 1982 she has been engaged at the Ugala Theatre – from 2007 until 2009, the theatre's troupe leader. Besides theatre roles, she has played also in films and television series

Filmography

 1983: Nipernaadi (feature film; in the role: Kati)
 1991: Noorelt õpitud (feature film)
 2009 and 2012: Kelgukoerad (television series)
 2019: Ükssarvik (feature film; in the role: Õie's mother)

References

Living people
1959 births
Estonian stage actresses
Estonian film actresses
Estonian television actresses
20th-century Estonian actresses
Estonian Academy of Music and Theatre alumni
Actresses from Tartu